Jalan Bota Kiri (Perak State Route A18) is a major road in Perak, Malaysia. It is also a main route to Pasir Salak Historical Complex in Pasir Salak.

List of junctions

Bota Kiri